Canavalia gladiata, the sword bean or scimitar bean, is a domesticated plant species in the legume family Fabaceae. It is used as a vegetable in interior central and south central India, though not commercially farmed. The unripe pods are also eaten as a vegetable in Africa and Asia.

The term "sword bean" is also used for other legumes, notably the common jack bean Canavalia ensiformis.

References

gladiata
Edible legumes
Flora of Japan
Flora of China
Flora of tropical Asia
Taxa named by Augustin Pyramus de Candolle